West Virginia Weekly was an African-American newspaper published in Charleston, West Virginia from 1933 through 1935. The editor was Earl S. Koger, and the paper's motto was "Official Negro press of West Virginia."

References

Defunct African-American newspapers
Defunct newspapers published in West Virginia
Publications established in 1933